Yekaterina Aleksandrovna Kostetskaya (born December 31, 1986) is a Russian track athlete. She came fifth in the 800 m final at the 2011 World Championships in Athletics, but was later disqualified for doping.

Kostetskaya met Australian pole vaulter Steve Hooker at the Beijing Olympics in 2008 and married him in 2012. They have a son and live in Melbourne, Australia.

Doping 
IAAF announced 28 July 2014, that Kostetskaya was sanctioned for doping after her biological passport had showed abnormalities. The two-year ban ended 20 January 2015.

International competitions

See also
List of doping cases in athletics
Doping at the Olympic Games
List of professional sports families
Russia at the World Athletics Championships
Doping at the World Athletics Championships

References

External links 
 
 Focus on Athletes: Yekaterina Kostetskaya (Internet Archive)
 sports-reference.com

1986 births
Living people
Athletes from Saint Petersburg
Russian female hurdlers
Russian female middle-distance runners
Olympic female middle-distance runners
Olympic athletes of Russia
Athletes (track and field) at the 2008 Summer Olympics
Athletes (track and field) at the 2012 Summer Olympics
Universiade silver medalists for Russia
Universiade medalists in athletics (track and field)
Competitors at the 2005 Summer Universiade
Medalists at the 2007 Summer Universiade
World Athletics Championships athletes for Russia
World Athletics U20 Championships winners
Russian Athletics Championships winners
Russian sportspeople in doping cases
Doping cases in athletics